Oluf Müller may refer to:

Oluf Christian Müller, Norwegian politician
Oluf C. Müller, Norwegian civil servant